Alex Blagg (born July 1, 1980) is an American writer, comedian and producer. He is best known as the co-creator and executive producer of Comedy Central's Emmy-winning late-night show,  @midnight, and Comedy Central's talk show Problematic with Moshe Kasher. He is also the creator of the satirical blog and video series A Bajillion Hits.

Career 
As an executive producer, Blagg was the co-founder and head of creative for comedy production company Serious Business. He has also been a writer/producer for Workaholics, Splitting Up Together, Alone Together, Betas and Trinkets, for which he won a Daytime Emmy for Outstanding Young Adult Series. Before becoming a writer and producer for television, he co-founded and was the managing editor of the Best Week Ever blog for VH1. He was also an editor-in-chief of MSN's Wonderwall at BermanBraun and was the head of celebrity programming for Buzzmedia. The @midnight show ended after its 600th episode.

Awards

References

External links
 
 

1980 births
Writers from California
Television producers from California
Primetime Emmy Award winners
Living people